"Counting the Days" is a song by the American rock band Collective Soul. It served as the lead single from their sixth studio album Youth. It is the band's first single released by their own independent record label, El Music Group, following the band's departure from Atlantic Records in 2001.

The song is featured on the soundtrack of the 2004 film NASCAR 3D: The IMAX Experience.

Charts

Acoustic version
An acoustic version is featured on the 2005 EP From the Ground Up.

References

2004 singles
2004 songs
Collective Soul songs
Songs written by Ed Roland